Proteomyxidea is a class of Cercozoa. Although it is known to be paraphyletic, further research is needed before its classification can be improved.

References

External links

 
Cercozoa classes